Ultimate Yanni is a compilation album by keyboardist and composer Yanni, released on the BMG Heritage label in 2003. The album peaked at #1 on Billboard's "Top New Age Albums" chart in 2004 and at #74 on the "Billboard 200" in 2003.

Background
This album collects the highlights of Yanni's best-selling albums including Optimystique,  Reflections of Passion, Dare to Dream, In My Time and a special version from his live album Live at the Acropolis. This is a remastered recordings.

Critical reception

In a review by Heather Phares of AllMusic, "The most complete retrospective of Yanni's work since Devotion: The Best of Yanni in 1997 and The Very Best of Yanni in 2000, Ultimate Yanni comes close to living up to its title. The double-disc, 24-track set features digitally remastered versions of definitive songs like "Marching Season", "To the One Who Knows", "Reflections of Passion", "Aria", "Santorini" and "Flight of Fantasy", and also includes tracks from his earliest albums as well as his compositions for the Olympics, Tour de France, and Wide World of Sports."

Track listing
Disc 1

Disc 2

Production
Compilation Produced by Rob Santos
Compiled by John Dilberto
Mastered by Elliott Federman at Saje Sound, NYC
Product Manager: John Hudson
Design: Smay Vision
Photography: Lynn Goldsmith
Project Coordination: Laura Dorson, Jeremy Holiday, Stephanie Kika, Sue Raffman and BettyAnn Rizzo
Thanks to Stacey Bain, Josie DiChiara, Joe DiMuro, Mandana Eidgah, Dean Haymeyer, Pete Jones, Mike Mjehovich, Alex Miller, Gary Newman, Steve Orselet, Stuart Pressman, Roseann Rizzo, Christoper Ross, Vicky Sarro and David Weyner

(Production as described in CD liner notes.)

References

External links
Official Website

Yanni albums
2003 compilation albums